The 2013–14 Spartak Moscow season was their 22nd season in the Russian Premier League, the highest tier of association football in Russia. They finished the season in 6th, reached the Round of 16 in the Russian Cup and were knocked out 2013–14 UEFA Europa League at the playoff stage by St. Gallen.

Season events
On 18 March, Valeri Karpin left his role as manager of Spartak, with Dmitri Gunko being placed in temporary charge. On 2 April, Gunko was announced as the club's manager until the end of the season.

Following the conclusion of the season, Russian Cup winners FC Rostov were excluded from the 2014-15 Europa League due to financial issues, with Spartak being appointed their replacement. However the decision was later overturned but CAS and Rostov took their place in the Europa League.

Squad

Out on loan

Left club during season

Transfers

In

Out

Loans out

Released

Competitions

Russian Premier League

Results by round

Results

Table

Russian Cup

UEFA Europa League

Play-off round

Squad statistics

Appearances and goals

|-
|colspan="14"|Players away from the club on loan:

|-
|colspan="14"|Players who appeared for Spartak Moscow that left during the season:

|}

Goal scorers

Clean sheets

Disciplinary record

References

FC Spartak Moscow seasons
Spartak Moscow
Spartak Moscow